Candelabrochaete is a genus of crust fungi in the family Phanerochaetaceae.

Taxonomy
The genus was circumscribed by French mycologist Jacques Boidin in 1970. He originally included two species, C. langloisii, and the type, C. africana.

Description
Similar to the genus Phanerochaete, Candelabrochaete features simple septa in the subicular hyphae and at the base of the basidia, and hyaline, thin-walled, nonamyloid spores. Several features distinguish Candelabrochaete from Phanerochaete. These include small, cylindrical to club-shaped (clavate) basidia, septate cystidia, a loosely interwoven subiculum (a mat of hyphae from which the fruitbody arises), and a loosely organized hymenium. This latter characteristic gives a farinaceous to woolly appearance to the fruitbodies.

Species
, Index Fungorum accepts 12 species in Candelabrochaete:
Candelabrochaete adnata Hjortstam (1995) – Brazil
Candelabrochaete africana  Boidin (1970) – Africa
Candelabrochaete cirrata  Hjortstam & Ryvarden (1986) – Argentina; British Virgin Islands; Brunei; Ghana; Kenya; Taiwan
Candelabrochaete dispar  Hjortstam & Ryvarden (1986) – Argentina
Candelabrochaete eruciformis  (G.Cunn.) Stalpers & P.K.Buchanan (1991)
Candelabrochaete langloisii  (Pat.) Boidin (1970)
Candelabrochaete macaronesica  M.Dueñas, Tellería & Melo (2008) – Faial Island; Madeira
Candelabrochaete magnahypha  (Burt) Burds. (1984)
Candelabrochaete mexicana  (Burt) P.Roberts (2000) – Cameroon; Venezuela
Candelabrochaete neocaledonica  Duhem & Buyck (2011) – New Caledonia
Candelabrochaete simulans  Hjortstam (1995) – Thailand
Candelabrochaete verruculosa  Hjortstam (1983) – Africa; Asia; Europe

References

Phanerochaetaceae
Polyporales genera
Fungi described in 1970